Racing Club is a football club from Genève, Switzerland; the club was founded in 1951, and is currently playing in the 2. Liga Interregional.

Players

Presidents

Stadium

Honours

Domestic

League
 None

Cups
 None

External links
 Racing on football.ch

Football clubs in Switzerland
Association football clubs established in 1951
1951 establishments in Switzerland